This is a list of rail trails in Australia.  It does not include proposed trails.

References

 
Rail trails
Australia, rail trails
Rail trails in Australia
Rail trails